John Rundle Cornish (7 October 1837 – 20 April 1918) was an Anglican bishop, the inaugural Bishop of St Germans from 1905 to 1918.

Born on 7 October 1837 he was educated at Sidney Sussex College, Cambridge, where he was 14th Wrangler in 1859. He was a Lecturer then Fellow at the College before studying for ordination. His subsequent appointments included a period as Vicar of Kenwyn, the post of Principal of Truro Training College and Archdeacon of Cornwall before a 15-year stint as  a suffragan bishop as the inaugural Bishop of St Germans. He died on 20 April 1918 and a school (the Bishop Cornish C of E VA Primary School) in the locality is named after him. After Cornish's death the bishopric of St Germans remained dormant for 56 years.

Notes

External links

Details of portrait within Cambridge Antiquarian Society collection

1837 births
Fellows of Sidney Sussex College, Cambridge
Bishops of St Germans
Archdeacons of Cornwall
1918 deaths